Gramais is a municipality of 41 inhabitants (as of 1 January 2019) in the district of Reutte in the Austrian state of Tyrol. The municipality is located in the district court Reutte. It is the smallest municipality in Austria.

Geography 
Gramais is located in a side valley of the Tyrolean Lech Valley, which branches off at Häselgehr. The municipality consists of two districts - the village Gramais and the hamlet Riefen. The rear municipal area also includes the Kogel and Rosskarsee.

Neighboring communities 
The neighboring communities are Bach, Häselgehr, Imst, Zams and Pfafflar.

History 
Gramais was first documented in 1427. The name deduce from lat. "Graminosa" (grassy) or from romance "grumoso" (weed-rich), rather "grassy area".

Settlement took place in the 13th century from the Imst area. First used only as pasture, developed here a permanent settlement. In 1837, Gramais still had 121 inhabitants. The community is today on a well-developed 8.5 km long road from Häselgehr reachable. Gramais was until 1938 part of the district Imst and until 1947 part of the judicial district Imst.

Coat of arms 
The rising bull over the red ground indicates the grazing and settlement of the Gramaiser valley of Imst.

References

Cities and towns in Reutte District